Mage Knight: Destiny's Soldier is a turn-based strategy video game for the Nintendo DS system based on the Wizkids Mage Knight tabletop game. It was produced by Namco and developed by Big Blue Bubble.

"It is your Destiny to build an army, command it to victory, and unite the war-torn Land."

Summary

The year is 435 Tz, and every faction in the land is at war. If it continues there won't be much land left to fight over. The strain on the world's magical energy is literally tearing the land apart. The land's fate lies in your hands. You must earn the respect of all the races of the land, and together you must fight to keep the land alive. Travel the land earning respect and engage in battles along your journey leading up to an all out war.

You are one of five heroes whose destiny is to unite the Mage Knight Factions, in a war that will decide the fate of the world. You must gather forces and march upon the castle of Rokos, home of the Solonavi, to stop their evil spells from destroying the planet. Along the way you will encounter many challenges, and face many foes. Meet a cast of varying sorts like Wrath, the young mage, Jarok'Din, the battle-hardened troll, and Vargana, the high and mighty sorceress. Fight in many locales, forests, mountains, swamps, and more in over 70 maps. Are you ready to face your destiny?

External links
 Mage Knight: Destiny's Soldier at Metacritic

Mage Knight
Nintendo DS games
Nintendo DS-only games
Turn-based strategy video games
2006 video games
North America-exclusive video games
Video games based on tabletop role-playing games
Video games developed in Canada
Big Blue Bubble games
Single-player video games